The Roman Catholic Archdiocese of Mariana is an archdiocese based in the city of Mariana in the Brazilian state of Minas Gerais.

Geography

Geography 
The archdiocese owns the parishes in seventy nine municipalities in four main regions in the state of Minas Gerais.

 Intermediate Geographic Region of Belo Horizonte
 Intermediate Geographic Region of Barbacena
 Intermediate Geographic Region of Juiz de Fora
 Intermediate Geographic Region of Ipatinga

Intermediate Geographic Region of Belo Horizonte 
One region at the Intermediate Geographic Region of Belo Horizonte.

Five municipalities.

Immediate Geographic Region of Santa Bárbara-Ouro Preto 
Five municipalities at the Immediate Geographic Region of Santa Bárbara-Ouro Preto.

 Ouro Preto
 Santa Bárbara
 Barão de Cocais
 Itabirito
 Mariana

Intermediate Geographic Region of Barbacena 
Two regions at the Intermediate Geographic Region of Barbacena.

Twenty eight municipalities.

Immediate Geographic Region of Barbacena 
Ten municipalities at the Immediate Geographic Region of Barbacena.

 Barbacena
 Alfredo Vasconcelos
 Alto Rio Doce
 Antônio Carlos
 Cipotânea
 Desterro do Melo
 Ibertioga
 Ressaquinha
 Santa Bárbara do Tugúrio
 Senhora dos Remédios

Immediate Geographic Region of Conselheiro Lafaiete 
Eighteen municipalities at the Immediate Geographic Region of Conselheiro Lafaiete.

 Conselheiro Lafaiete
 Capela Nova
 Caranaíba
 Carandaí
 Catas Altas da Noruega
 Congonhas
 Cristiano Otoni
 Entre Rios de Minas
 Itaverava
 Jeceaba
 Lamim
 Ouro Branco
 Piranga
 Queluzito
 Rio Espera
 Santana dos Montes
 São Brás do Suaçuí
 Senhora de Oliveira

Intermediate Geographic Region of Juiz de Fora 
Six regions at the Intermediate Geographic Region of Juiz de Fora.

Fourty five municipalities.

Immediate Geographic Region of Juiz de Fora 
Two municipalities at the Immediate Geographic Region of Juiz de Fora.

 Oliveira Fortes
 Paiva

Immediate Geographic Region of Carangola 
One municipality at the Immediate Geographic Region of Carangola.

 Pedra Bonita

Immediate Geographic Region of Manhuaçu 
Two municipalities at the Immediate Geographic Region of Manhuaçu.

 Matipó
 Santa Margarida

Immediate Geographic Region of Viçosa 
Sixteen municipalities at the Immediate Geographic Region of Viçosa.

 Viçosa
 Abre-Campo
 Araponga
 Barra Longa
 Brás Pires
 Cajuri
 Canaã
 Catas Altas
 Coimbra
 Ervália
 Paula Cândido
 Pedra do Anta
 Porto Firme
 Presidente Bernardes
 São Miguel do Anta
 Teixeiras

Immediate Geographic Region of Ponte Nova 
Seventeen municipalities at the Immediate Geographic Region of Ponte Nova.

 Ponte Nova
 Acaiaca
 Amparo da Serra
 Diogo de Vasconcelos
 Dom Silvério
 Guaraciaba
 Jequeri
 Oratórios
 Piedade de Ponte Nova
 Rio Casca
 Rio Doce
 Santa Cruz do Escalvado
 Santo Antônio do Grama
 São Pedro dos Ferros
 Sem-Peixe
 Sericita
 Urucânia

Immediate Geographic Region of Ubá 
Seven municipalities at the Immediate Geographic Region of Ubá.

 Divinésia
 Dores do Turvo
 Mercês
 Rio Pomba
 Senador Firmino
 Silveirânia
 Tabuleiro

Intermediate Geographic Region of Ipatinga 
One region at the Intermediate Geographic Region of Ipatinga.

One municipality.

Immediate Geographic Region of Caratinga 
One municipality at the Immediate Geographic Region of Caratinga.

 Raul Soares

History
On 6 December 1745 the Diocese of Mariana was established with territory taken from the Diocese of São Sebastião do Rio de Janeiro. 

In 1748, after release from prison, formerly enslaved prostitute Rosa Egipcíaca began to preach to crowds about her religious visions. In 1749 she was accused of witchcraft by the Bishop of Mariana and whipped in Vila de Mariana as a punishment. This punishment paralysed the right side of her body for the rest of her life.  Egipcíaca became the first black woman in Brazil to write book, which was entitled Sagrada Teologia do Amor Divino das Almas Peregrinas.

On 1 May 1906 it was promoted to Metropolitan Archdiocese of Mariana. By 2013 there was one priest for every 5,482 Catholics.

Special churches

Minor Basilicas:
 Basílica do Senhor Bom Jesus, Congonhas do Campo
 Basílica Sagrado Coração de Jesus, Conselheiro Lafaiete
 Basílica São José Operário, Barbacena
 Basílica de Nossa Senhora do Pilar Ouro Preto

Bishops

Ordinaries, in reverse chronological order
 Archbishops of Mariana (Roman rite), below
 Airton José dos Santos (2018.04.25 – currently)
 Geraldo Lyrio Rocha (2007.04.11 – 2018.04.25) - currently archbishop emeritus 
 Luciano Pedro Mendes de Almeida, S.J. (1988.04.06 – 2006.08.27)
 Oscar de Oliveira (1960.04.25 – 1988.04.06)
 Helvécio Gomes de Oliveira, S.D.B. (1922.11.10 – 1960.04.25)
 Silvério Gomes Pimenta (1906.05.01 – 1922.09.01)
 Bishops of Mariana (Roman Rite), below
 Silvério Gomes Pimenta (later Archbishop) (1897.12.03 – 1906.05.01)
 Antônio Maria Corrêa de Sá e Benevides (1877.06.25 – 1896.07.15)
 Antônio Ferreira Viçoso, C.M. (1844.01.12 – 1875.08.05)
 Carlos Pereira Freire de Moura (1840 – 1840)
 José da Santíssima Trindade Leite, O.F.M. (1819.09.27 – 1835.09.28)
 Cypriano de São José, O.F.M. (1797.07.24 – 1817.08.14)
 Domingos da Encarnação Pontevel, O.P. (1779.03.01 – 1795.06.16)
 Bartolomeu Manoel Mendes dos Reis (孟主教) (1773.03.08 – 1778.08.28)
 Joaquim Borges de Figueroa (later Archbishop) (1771.06.17 – 1773.03.08)
 Manoel da Cruz Nogueira, O.Cist. (1745.12.15 – 1764.01.03)

Coadjutor bishops
Helvécio Gomes de Oliveira, S.D.B. (1922)
Oscar de Oliveira (1959-1960)

Auxiliary bishops
Silvério Gomes Pimenta (1890-1896), appointed Bishop here
Modesto Augusto Vieira (1914-1916)
Antônio Augusto de Assis (1918-1931) (appointed Archbishop (personal title) when appointed Auxiliary Bishop here); appointed Archbishop (personal title) of Jaboticabal, São Paulo
Daniel Tavares Baeta Neves (1947-1958), appointed Bishop of Januária, Minas Gerais

Other priests of this diocese who became bishops
Joaquim Silvério de Souza, appointed Coadjutor Bishop of Diamantina in 1901
Carlos Carmelo de Vasconcellos Motta, appointed Auxiliary Bishop of Diamantina, Minas Gerais in 1932; future Cardinal
José Heleno, appointed Coadjutor Bishop of Governador Valadares, Minas Gerais in 1976
Geraldo Majela Reis, appointed Bishop of Três Lagoas, Mato Grosso do Sul in 1978
José Eudes Campos do Nascimento, appointed Bishop of Leopoldina, Minas Gerais in 2012
Geovane Luís da Silva, appointed Auxiliary Bishop of Belo Horizonte, Minas Gerais in 2016
Walter Jorge Pinto, appointed Bishop of União da Vitória, Parana in 2019

Suffragan dioceses
 Diocese of Caratinga 
 Diocese of Governador Valadares
 Diocese of Itabira–Fabriciano

References

Sources

External links
 GCatholic.org
 Catholic Hierarchy
  Archdiocese website (Portuguese)

Roman Catholic dioceses in Brazil
Roman Catholic ecclesiastical provinces in Brazil
 
Religious organizations established in 1745
Dioceses established in the 18th century
Mariana, Minas Gerais
1745 establishments in Brazil